Miss Universe 1970 was the 19th Miss Universe pageant, held at the Miami Beach Auditorium in Miami Beach, Florida, United States on 11 July 1970. 

At the end of the event, Gloria Diaz of the Philippines crowned Marisol Malaret of Puerto Rico as Miss Universe 1970. It is the first victory of Puerto Rico in the competition.

Contestants from 64 countries and territories participated in this year's pageant. The pageant was hosted by Bob Barker in his fourth consecutive year, while June Lockhart provided commentary and analysis throughout the event.

Results

Placements

Special Awards

Contestants 
64 contestants competed for the title.

Notes

Debuts

Returns 
Last competed in 1965:
 
Last competed in 1967:
 
 
Last competed in 1968:

Withdrawals 
 Bonaire - No national contest held.
  - Warunee Sangsirinavin, the winner of Miss Thailand 1969 was underage before February 1. But she competed in 1971 instead.

References

1970
1970 in Florida
1970 beauty pageants
Beauty pageants in the United States
Events in Miami Beach, Florida
July 1970 events in the United States